New Hampshire's 4th State Senate district is one of 24 districts in the New Hampshire Senate. It has been represented by Democrat David Watters since 2012.

Geography
District 4 is based in Strafford County, including Dover and the nearby towns of Barrington, Rollinsford, and Somersworth. Between 2002 and 2012, the district included most of Belknap County and two towns in Strafford County. 

The district is located entirely within New Hampshire's 1st congressional district. It borders the state of Maine.

Recent election results

2020

2018

2016

2014

2012

Federal and statewide results in District 4

Historical election results
These results happened prior to 2012 redistricting, and thus were held under very different district lines.

2010

2008

2006

References

4
Strafford County, New Hampshire